The men's 1500 metre freestyle event at the 1964 Olympic Games took place between October 16 and 17. This swimming event used freestyle swimming, which means that the method of the stroke is not regulated (unlike backstroke, breaststroke, and butterfly events). Nearly all swimmers use the front crawl or a variant of that stroke. Because an Olympic-size swimming pool is 50 metres long, this race consisted of 30 lengths of the pool.

Medalists

Results

Heats

Five heats were held; the eight fastest swimmers advanced to the Finals.  Those that advanced are highlighted.

Heat One

Heat Two

Heat Three

Heat Four

Heat Five

Final

Key: OR = Olympic record

References

Men's freestyle 1500 metre
Men's events at the 1964 Summer Olympics